Crimora edwardsi is a species of colourful sea slug, a dorid nudibranch, a marine gastropod mollusk in the family Polyceridae.

Distribution
This species was described from Port Jackson, New South Wales, Australia.

Description
The illustration of Angas appears to show a species of Crimora, not Nembrotha. O'Donoghue (1924) did not replace the name Nembrotha with Angasiella because he did not believe this species belonged to Nembrotha. It has been rediscovered in southern Queensland.

References

Polyceridae
Gastropods described in 1864